is the stage name for a Japanese cinema actor active from the late-1940s to the early 1960s. His real name was Kanichi Nakai. He was the father of the actor Kiichi Nakai and actress Kie Nakai.

Biography
Sada was born in Shimogyō-ku, Kyoto, to a merchant class family. After graduating from the 2nd Kyoto Municipal Commercial School, he entered the School of Political Science and Economics at Waseda University in Tokyo. While a student, he roomed at a boarding house owned by the actor Shuji Sano, and on graduation was offered a position at Shochiku Studios in Kanagawa. He also was given his stage name by Shugi Sada.

In his debut appearance in 1947, Phoenix, directed by Keisuke Kinoshita, Sada was paired with Kinuyo Tanaka in a love scene. As Tanaka was already a big-name movie star, this was an immediate boost for Sada's career.

Sada's career took off in the 1950s, and he starred in an average of eight to ten movies per year. In 1956, he was awarded the Mainichi Film Award and Blue Ribbon Awards for Best Actor for his role as a talent scout in I Will Buy You, Masaki Kobayashi's critical study of the institutional ethics of Japanese baseball.

Sada was killed in an automobile accident in Nirasaki, Yamanashi on August 17, 1964, while returning from his summer cottage in the Tateshina Mountains of Nagano Prefecture. His memorial services were held in Aoyama Cemetery in Tokyo with thousands of fans attending; however, his grave is at the temple of Engaku-ji in Kamakura.

Selected filmography

  (1947) - Shinichi Yasaka
  (1947)
  (1948)
  (1948)
  (1948) - Shūhei Kagami
  (1949)
  (1949) - Gorō
  (1949)
  (1949) - Kohei Kobotoke
  (1949) - Kohei Kobotake
  (1949) - Hidetaka
  (1949)
  (1950)
  (1950)
  (1950)
 Home Sweet Home (1951) - Saburo Uchiyama, Tomoko's boyfriend
 Carmen Comes Home (1951) – Mr. Ogawa, the young school master
  (1951)
  (1951)
  (1951) - Shūji Takaishi
 Fireworks Over the Sea (1951) – Tamihiko Kujirai
  (1951) - Shuji Imura
  (1952) - Haruzo Yukawa
  (1952)
  (1952)
  (1953) - Tatsuya, street musician
  (1953)
  (1953-1954, part 1-3)
  (1953) - Goro Akiyama
  (1953)
  (1954)
  (1954) - Ryoichi Morita
  (1954)
  (1954)
  (1955) - Akimasa
  (1955)
  (1955)
  (1955) - Shunsuke, Fuyuko's brother-in-law
  (1956) - (uncredited)
  (1956)
 I Will Buy You (1956) – Daisuke Kishimoto
  (1956)
  (1956)
  (1956)
  (1957)
  (1957) - Kazuo
  (1957)
  (1957) - Yoshizawa, Diet member
 Times of Joy and Sorrow (1957) - Shiro Arisawa, Kiyoko's husband
  (1957)
 Danger Stalks Near (1957) - Kaneshige Satō
  (1958) - Takashi Kiso
  (1958)
  (1958)
  (1958)
 Equinox Flower (1958) - Masahiko Taniguchi
  (1958)
  (1959)
 The Human Condition (1959) - Kageyama
  (1959) - Eitarō Makita
 Good Morning (1959) - Heiichirō Fukui
 High Teen (1959) - Shin'ichi Teras'aki
  (1960) - Masashi Takayama
  (1960)
  (1960)
  (1960) - Takashi Kiguchi
 Late Autumn (1960) - Shotaru Goto
  (1960)
  (1961) - Shōzō Nishikawa
  (1961)
 Immortal Love (1961) - Takashi
  (1961) - Yonesaku Nihei
  (1961)
 Hunting Rifle (1961) - Kadota
  (1961)
  (1962)
  (1962)
  (1962)
  (1962)
 An Autumn Afternoon (1962) - Koichi
  (1962) - Yoshio Nonaka, Torae's husband
  (1963) - Singer at the ceremony
  (1963) - Yajuro
  (1963) - Shunsuke Kuze
  (1963, TV Series)
  (1963) - Jirō Okuyama
  (1963) - Tadao Tsumura
  (1964) - Ryosuke
 Assassination (1964)
  (1964) - Shigeharu Takazawa
 Sweet Sweat (1964) - Tatsuoka
  (1964) - (final film role)

References

External links
 
 

1926 births
1964 deaths
Japanese male film actors
Male actors from Kyoto
20th-century Japanese male actors
Road incident deaths in Japan